Michael Charlton (born 1 May 1927) is an Australian-born Gold Logie winning former journalist and broadcaster, who worked for the BBC in the United Kingdom for many years.

Biography
Charlton was born in Sydney to broadcaster Conrad and Hazel Charlton, both born in New Zealand, and is the elder brother of Australian sports broadcaster and Order of Australia recipient Tony Charlton. He initially worked for the Australian Broadcasting Corporation (ABC) as a presenter in current affairs and commentator for Test cricket matches, but later moved to London. He was the Australian representative on the BBC radio cricket commentary team for the 1956 Test series between England and Australia.  
 
In 1961 he was the inaugural presenter of Four Corners, an Australian current affairs programme. In 1963 he was the recipient of the Australian Gold Logie award.

From 1962 to 1976 he was a reporter and interviewer for Panorama, reporting live from America in the aftermath of the Kennedy assassination. In July 1969 he reported live from mission control for the BBC during the Apollo 11 moon landing. Later, during the 1980s, he presented It's Your World, a phone-in programme on the BBC World Service. He also presented the news and current affairs programme 'Newsday' on BBC2 in the 1970s.

Charlton wrote the 1986 seven-episode documentary TV series Out of the Fiery Furnace with Robert Raymond. The series traced the development of metallurgy from the Stone Age to the space age. Nuclear industry advocate Ian Hore-Lacy also worked closely with the production team. The series was shown in 20 countries.

Awards

Selected works

References

1927 births
Living people
British male journalists
Australian cricket commentators
Gold Logie winners
Articles containing video clips
Australian emigrants to the United Kingdom
Panorama (British TV programme)